Fatemiye University of Medical Sciences was a women's college of medicine in the city of Qom in central Iran. It was liquidated in 2013.

References 

Universities in Iran
Defunct universities and colleges
Education in Qom Province